Frances Altick (born February 22, 1994, in Shreveport, Louisiana) is an American tennis player.

Altick has won two doubles titles on the ITF tour in her career. On July 18, 2016, she reached her best singles ranking of world number 840. On July 25, 2016, she peaked at world number 825 in the doubles rankings.

Altick was awarded a wild card for the main draw at the 2016 Volvo Car Open, where she made her debut on the WTA tour. She lost in straight sets to Alison Riske.

In 2016, Altick graduated from Vanderbilt University with a BS in psychology. She had spent four years playing tennis for the Commodores, helping them to an NCAA championship in 2015.

ITF finals

Singles: 1 (0–1)

Doubles: 3 (2–1)

References

External links 
 
 
 Frances Altick profile at Vanderbilt University

1994 births
Living people
Sportspeople from Shreveport, Louisiana
American female tennis players
Tennis people from Louisiana
Vanderbilt Commodores women's tennis players
21st-century American women